Filisignella is a monotypic moth genus in the family Gelechiidae erected by Anthonie Johannes Theodorus Janse in 1951. Its only species, Filisignella cirrhaea, was first described by Edward Meyrick in 1914. It is found in South Africa.

The wingspan is about 16 mm. The forewings are white, tinged with yellowish posteriorly. The hindwings are light grey.

References

Endemic moths of South Africa
Apatetrinae